Thyellisca lamellosa is a species of marine clams in the family Semelidae.

References

External links 
 Thyellisca lamellosa at the Catalogue of Life
 Thyellisca lamellosa at the World Register of Marine Species (WoRMS)

Semelidae
Molluscs described in 1873